Living in a Dream may refer to:

"Living in a Dream" (Finger Eleven song), 2010
"Living in a Dream" (Pseudo Echo song), 1986
"Det vackraste", a 1995 Swedish song, released with the English title "Living in a Dream"
Living in a Dream (album), a 2005 live album by Arc Angels

See also
Living a Dream, a 2005 album by Katherine Jenkins
Livin' on a Dream, a 2007 album by Robin Beck
"Living in a Child's Dream" a 1967 single by the Masters Apprentices
Living the Dream (disambiguation)